
This is a list of archives from around the world. An archive is an establishment that collects, stores and preserves knowledge in several formats: books, manuscripts, journals, newspapers, magazines, sound and music recordings, videos, play-scripts, patents, databases, maps, stamps, prints, drawings and more. The International Council on Archives comprises 1400 members in 199 countries.

By country 

 
 Archives in Afghanistan
 Archives in Albania
 Archives in Algeria
 Archives in Andorra
 Archives in Angola
 Archives in Antigua and Barbuda
 Archives in Argentina
 Archives in Armenia
 Archives in Australia
 Archives in Austria
 Archives in Azerbaijan
 Archives in the Bahamas
 Archives in Bahrain
 Archives in Bangladesh
 Archives in Barbados
 Archives in Belarus
 Archives in Belgium
 Archives in Belize
 Archives in Benin
 Archives in Bhutan
 Archives in Bolivia
 Archives in Bosnia and Herzegovina
 Archives in Botswana
 Archives in Brazil
 Archives in Brunei
 Archives in Bulgaria
 Archives in Burkina Faso
 Archives in Burma
 Archives in Burundi
 Archives in Cambodia
 Archives in Cameroon
 Archives in Canada
 Archives in Cape Verde
 Archives in the Central African Republic
 Archives in Chad
 Archives in Chile
 Archives in China
 Archives in Colombia
 Archives in Comoros
 Archives in Costa Rica
 Archives in Croatia
 Archives in Cuba
 Archives in Cyprus
 Archives in the Czech Republic
 Archives in the Democratic Republic of the Congo
 Archives in Denmark
 Archives in Djibouti
 Archives in Dominica
 Archives in East Timor
 Archives in the Dominican Republic
 Archives in Ecuador
 Archives in Egypt
 Archives in El Salvador
 Archives in Equatorial Guinea
 Archives in Eritrea
 Archives in Estonia
 Archives in Ethiopia
 Archives in the Federated States of Micronesia
 Archives in Fiji
 Archives in Finland
 Archives in France
 Archives in Gabon
 Archives in the Gambia
 Archives in Georgia
 Archives in Germany
 Archives in Ghana
 Archives in Greece
 Archives in Greenland
 Archives in Grenada
 Archives in Guatemala
 Archives in Guinea
 Archives in Guinea-Bissau
 Archives in Guyana
 Archives in Haiti
 Archives in Honduras
 Archives in Hong Kong
 Archives in Hungary
 Archives in Iceland
 Archives in India
 Archives in Indonesia
 Archives in Iran
 Archives in Iraq
 Archives in Ireland
 Archives in Israel
 Archives in Italy
 Archives in Ivory Coast
 Archives in Jamaica
 Archives in Japan
 Archives in Jordan
 Archives in Kazakhstan
 Archives in Kenya
 Archives in Kiribati
 Archives in Kuwait
 Archives in Kyrgyzstan
 Archives in Laos
 Archives in Latvia
 Archives in Lebanon
 Archives in Lesotho
 Archives in Liberia
 Archives in Libya
 Archives in Liechtenstein
 Archives in Lithuania
 Archives in Luxembourg
 Archives in Macau
 Archives in Madagascar
 Archives in Malawi
 Archives in Malaysia
 Archives in the Maldives
 Archives in Mali
 Archives in Malta
 Archives in the Marshall Islands
 Archives in Mauritania
 Archives in Mauritius
 Archives in Mexico
 Archives in Moldova
 Archives in Monaco
 Archives in Mongolia
 Archives in Montenegro
 Archives in Morocco
 Archives in Mozambique
 Archives in Myanmar
 Archives in Namibia
 Archives in Nauru
 Archives in Nepal
 Archives in the Netherlands
 Archives in New Zealand
 Archives in Nicaragua
 Archives in Niger
 Archives in Nigeria
 Archives in North Korea
 Archives in North Macedonia
 Archives in Norway
 Archives in Oman
 Archives in Pakistan
 Archives in Palau
 Archives in Panama
 Archives in Papua New Guinea
 Archives in Paraguay
 Archives in Peru
 Archives in the Philippines
 Archives in Poland
 Archives in Portugal
 Archives in Qatar
 Archives in the Republic of the Congo
 Archives in Romania
 Archives in Russia
 Archives in Rwanda
 Archives in Saint Kitts and Nevis
 Archives in Saint Lucia
 Archives in Saint Vincent and the Grenadines
 Archives in Samoa
 Archives in San Marino
 Archives in São Tomé and Príncipe
 Archives in Saudi Arabia
 Archives in Senegal
 Archives in Serbia
 Archives in Seychelles
 Archives in Sierra Leone
 Archives in Singapore
 Archives in Slovakia
 Archives in Slovenia
 Archives in the Solomon Islands
 Archives in Somalia
 Archives in South Africa
 Archives in South Korea
 Archives in South Sudan
 Archives in Spain
 Archives in Sri Lanka
 Archives in Sudan
 Archives in Suriname
 Archives in Swaziland
 Archives in Sweden
 Archives in Switzerland
 Archives in Syria
 Archives in Taiwan
 Archives in Tajikistan
 Archives in Tanzania
 Archives in Thailand
 Archives in Timor-Leste
 Archives in Togo
 Archives in Tonga
 Archives in Trinidad and Tobago
 Archives in Tunisia
 Archives in Turkey
 Archives in Turkmenistan
 Archives in Tuvalu
 Archives in Uganda
 Archives in Ukraine
 Archives in the United Arab Emirates
 Archives in the United Kingdom
 Archives in the United States
 Archives in Uruguay
 Archives in Uzbekistan
 Archives in Vanuatu
 Archives in Vatican City
 Archives in Venezuela
 Archives in Vietnam
 Archives in Yemen
 Archives in Zambia
 Archives in Zimbabwe

By format 

 List of film archives
 List of sound archives

See also 

 Archival science
 Archivist and List of archivists
 Data proliferation
 International Council on Archives
 Internet Archive
 List of archivists
 List of libraries by country
 List of museums
 List of national archives
 List of historical societies
 Preservation (library and archival science)
 Web archiving

References

External links 
 ICA (International Council on Archives)
 
 ICA Section for Archives of Literature and Art (SLA): World-Wide Directory of Repositories holding Literary Archives, 2019

 
Archives